Old Ship African Methodist Episcopal Zion Church is a historic African Methodist Episcopal Zion Church in Montgomery, Alabama.  It is the oldest African American church congregation in the city, established in 1852.  The current Classical Revival-style building was designed by Jim Alexander and was completed in 1918.  It is the fourth building the congregation has erected at this location.  Scenes from the 1982 television movie Sister, Sister were shot at the church.  It was placed on the Alabama Register of Landmarks and Heritage on March 3, 1976, and the National Register of Historic Places on January 24, 1991.

See also
Properties on the Alabama Register of Landmarks and Heritage in Montgomery County, Alabama

References

External links
 

National Register of Historic Places in Montgomery, Alabama
Neoclassical architecture in Alabama
Churches completed in 1918
20th-century Methodist church buildings in the United States
Properties on the Alabama Register of Landmarks and Heritage
Churches on the National Register of Historic Places in Alabama
African Methodist Episcopal Zion churches in Alabama
African-American history in Montgomery, Alabama
Churches in Montgomery, Alabama
Religious organizations established in 1852
1852 establishments in Alabama
Neoclassical church buildings in the United States